Timothy Stevens may refer to:

 Tim Stevens (born 1946), British Anglican bishop
 Timothy Stevens (cyclist) (born 1989), Belgian cyclist